Pieter Kok (born in June 1972) is a Dutch physicist and one of the co-developers of quantum interferometric optical lithography.

Kok was born in Friesland in the Netherlands. In 1997 he graduated from the University of Utrecht with a degree in Foundations of Quantum Theory. In 2001, he received his PhD in physics from the University of Wales, Bangor. His research specializations include linear optical implementations of quantum communication and computation protocols, quantum teleportation and the interpretation of quantum theory.  

Dr. Kok has worked in the Quantum Computing Technologies Group at the NASA/Jet Propulsion Laboratory, in Pasadena, California, Hewlett-Packard Laboratories in Bristol, England and at the Department of Materials, University of Oxford.  He is a Professor of Theoretical Physics at the University of Sheffield.

He and his wife, Rose Roberto, live in northern England with their two children.

References

Selected publications

External links 
"Quantum Computing" in 
https://web.archive.org/web/20120209122709/http://ldsd.group.shef.ac.uk/members/?name=Kok
thesis url summary

1972 births
Living people
21st-century Dutch physicists
Alumni of Bangor University
People from Friesland
Theoretical physicists
Utrecht University alumni